The 1979 Durham mayoral election was held on November 6, 1979 to elect the mayor of Durham, North Carolina. It saw the election of Harry E. Rodenhizer Jr., who unseated incumbent mayor Wade L. Cavin.

Results

Primary 
The date of the primary was October 9.

General election

References 

Durham
Mayoral elections in Durham, North Carolina
Durham